The Prince of Wales'–St. Sebastian's Cricket Encounter (The Battle of the Golds) is an annual cricket match played between Prince of Wales' College and St. Sebastian's College since 1933. It is known as The Battle of the Golds due to the colours of the two school's flags i.e. Purple, Gold and Maroon of Prince of Wales' College and Green, White & Gold of St. Sebastian's College.

History 
The encounter is considered to be one of the oldest big matches in Sri Lanka as it dates back to 1933. The first match in the sequence was played in 1933 under captain, Eugine Silva of St. Sebastian's College and Duncan Fernando of Prince of Wales College.  The inaugural match however ended in a low scoring draw. In 1935 the Cambrians  made history by recording the first win of the series with Ernie F. de Mel leading the side. De Mel's side registered a thrilling 4-wicket win against their rivals led by Earl Wijesinghe. The Cambrians led by KM Jayasekara went on to register back-to-back wins in the following two years by a thrilling 43-runs in 1936 and a comfortable innings and 87 runs in 1937. On both occasions, K.A.S Perera captained St. Sebastian's. There was a break in the series from 1938 to 1953.

The series resumed in 1954 with the match ending in a high-scoring draw. In 1955 Raymond de Silva's Sebastianites lost to the Cambrians for the fourth time by 9 wickets. Prince of Wales' was led by Stanley de Alwis. Draws followed for the next three years and Prince of Wales' expanded their winning tally to 5–nil in 1959 with an emphatic innings and 56-run win. Suranjith Mendis led the winning side while his counterpart was Sirimal Fernando. The encounter continued in stalemates for two years and in 1962 St. Sebastian's got their first-ever victory under Priyantha Fernando. They beat the Cambrians led by Hyasti Aponso by 5 wickets. After three consecutive draws, St. Sebastian's recorded their second win under Sarath Perera. Perera's side beat the Cambrians captained by Leslie de Silva by massive innings and 152 runs. Deadlocks followed for a decade until the Cambrians led by Pemlal Fernando recorded an 8-wicket win in a low-scoring encounter against Walter Fernando's Sebastianites.

Since the start, the Cambrians have six wins while the Sebastianites have won thrice in the series with the rest ending in draws. St Sebastian's had their last victory in 2011 under the guidance of Captain Saneetha De Mel and was unable to take 2012 which ended in a draw. Prince of Wales's has not won a match since 1977.

Among the outstanding performances in the encounter Nilantha Bopage from Prince of Wales holds the record for the highest run scorer in a match with 179 not out in 1991. For the Sebastian's Nalin Peiris was the highest scorer with two centuries in years 1957 and 1958. Among the leading wicket takers, the record for the most number of wickets in the series is held by Roger Wijesuriya taking 22 wickets for St. Sebastians from 1975 to 1979.

Limited Over match started in 1981. It wasn't played between 1983 and 1987.

Highest Aggregate of Runs in the Big Match Series is by Sahan Wijeratne. Sahan Wijeratne representing Cambrians from 2000 to 2003 scored 441 runs including two centuries and two half-centuries with his series aggregate of 73.5. He is the first centurion of the Limited Over Match with a score of 116 runs in 2003.

During their rich history of nearly 100 years of cricket both schools have produced prominent cricketers to the national stream. Beginning from Anton Sethupathy, Duleep Mendis, Prasanna Jayawardene, Amal Silva, Somachandra de Silva, Dr. O.L.F. Senaratne, H.I. Femando, Nisal Senaratne, Stanley de Alwis, Lasantha Rodrigo, Anura Polonowita, D.S. de Silva, Sarath Fernando, Lantra Fernando, Granville de Silva, Chaminda Mendis, Romesh Kaluwitharana, Amila Aponso, Shehan Jayasuriya, Oshada Fernando, Vishwa Fernando, Avishka Fernando, Praveen Jayawickrama to Lahiru Thirimanne and Kusal Mendis.

Atmosphere 
The "Battle of the Golds" is filled with pageantry. With decorated tents, flags and baila singing and dancing groups present all around the Moratuwa city and the ground itself during the match days and in the days leading up to it. The 2-day match is held on Friday and Saturday, The 1-day limited over match is held on Sunday. By tradition, the schools are closed on match days to allow students to attend the Big Match. Souvenirs published by the both schools. Before the match, the students of each school take a motorcade (well known as "The Truck Parade") with bands and decorations and other colorful items showing support for their team. Overloaded cars with supporters singing and careering along the streets is a familiar sight during match days.

The match is looked forward to by both the young and old, male and female, and even those who had no connection with either school would turn up and enjoy the celebrations. It is more of an occasion for the old boys and present students of both schools coming together for 3 days of fun and revelry. It is quite normal to see elderly alumni from either schools coming to the "Big Match" to relive old times and meet old friends.

Past Results

2-Day Matches 

Results of the 2-day matches
Matches Played – 71
Matches Drawn – 61
Matches Won by Prince of Wales' College – 06
Matches Won by St. Sebastian's College – 03
Matches with no-result – 01

Records 

Prince of Wales' College
Highest Score: 179 (not out) by Nilantha Bopage in 1991
Best Bowling: 7 for 33 by Suranga Wijenayake in 1995
Highest Total: 415/9 in 1958
Lowest Total: 67 in 1984
Highest Partnership: 247 by WG Fernando and Sunil de Silva in 1960

St. Sebastian's College:
Highest Score: 148 by Gerald Mendis in 1966
Best Bowling: 8 for 53 by Anuk de Alwis in 2009
Highest Total: 321/7 in 1966
Lowest Total: 36 in 1937
Highest Partnership: 219 runs by Jude Fernando and Prasanna Fernando in 1978

Result Table

1-Day Limited Over Matches 

Results of the 1-day limited over matches
Matches Played – 36
Matches Won by St. Sebastian's College – 17
Matches Won by Prince of Wales' College – 15
Matches with No Decision – 02
Matches Drawn – 01
Matches with no-result – 01

Records 

Prince of Wales' College
Highest Total: 287/9 in 2011
Lowest Total: 62 in 1982
Highest Partnership: 103 runs by Lahiru Thirimanne 51 and Sanka Peiris 55 in 2006

St. Sebastian's College:
Highest Total: 288/4 in 2011
Lowest Total: 90 in 2001
Highest Partnership: 140 runs by Buddhika Mendis 74 and Prasanna Jayawardena 75 in 1997

Result Table

Captains of Series

Batting and Bowling Records

Prince of Wales' College Team 
Batting and bowling records by Prince of Wales' College team's players in 2-day matches.

Batting

Centuries 
Jagath de Soysa is the first centurion for Cambrians in the big match series.

Scores of Fifty & Over

Bowling 
Suranga Wijenayake is the highest wicket-taker for Prince of Wales' College in single inning. He took 7 wickets for 33 runs in 1995.

Four Wickets & Over in an Inning

St. Sebastian's College Team 
Batting and bowling records by St. Sebastian's College team's players in 2-day matches.

Batting 
The highest individual total by a Sebastian came in 1966 off the bat of Gerald Mendis as the batsman notched up 148.

Centuries

Scores of Fifty & Over

Bowling 
Anuk De Alwis is the highest wicket-taker for St. Sebastian's College in single inning. He took 8 wickets for 53 runs in 1995.

Four Wickets & Over in an Inning

Best Partnership Records in 1-Day Limited Over Matches

Cricket Coaches

Prince of Wales' College 
List of Prince of Wales' College cricket coaches from 1876 to date
 J.C. Mckeyzer
 Claude Orr
 A. Vandergert
 E. Weerasooriya
 C.V. Samarasinghe
 C. Manakularathne
 N.D.De.S. Wijesekara
 Condrad Rodrigo
 Nisal Senarathne
 H.I. Fernando
 P.H.S. Mendis
 Harward Fernando
 Vernon Perera
 R.T.N. Fernando
 Sunil de Silva
 Chitral Mendis
 Bandula De Silva
 Jayantha Perera
 Lantra Fernando
 Kushan Jayawikrama

St. Sebastian's College 
 Sanjeewa Silva
 Neil Rajapakse
 Heshan de Mel
 Imal Botheju
 Nalin Wijesinghe

Challenge Trophies

Family Members Who Played In The Series

Brothers In The Series

Prince of Wales' College 
Brothers who played for the Prince of Wales' College team between 1933 and 2006

K.P. JayasekeraK.M. Jayasekera
Terence PeirisLloyed Peiris
Lasantha RodrigoRanjan Rodrigo
Gamini SilvaSudharman Silva
Pemlal FernandoShantilal Fernando
Yasendra De SilvaSarath De SilvaManjusiri De SilvaBandula De Silva
Brindley PereraEverie Perera

Sarath FernandoNilmal Fernando
Ray FernandoVere Fernando
Omar JayasekeraPriyantha Jayasekera
Shriyan SamararatnaSavindra Samararatna
Nimal CoorayLakdasa CooraySrinath CoorayMahes Cooray
Chitral MendisHemal Mendis

Lalin BharethiLaksiri Bharethi
Shiran FerdinandoShalin Ferdinando
Suranjith MendisHemal Mendis Snr.Ajith Mendis
Anura JayakodyRohana Jayakody
Ravi RatnapalaEraj Ratnapala
Priyantha WijesuriyaNalaka Wijesuriya

Fathers & Sons In The Series

Prince of Wales' College 
Fathers & Sons who played for the Prince of Wales' College team between 1933 and 2006

G.P. De SilvaSunil De Silva

Leslie De SilvaLakshantha De Silva

H.F.F. SenaratneNisal Senaratne

Venues 
De Soysa Stadium, Moratuwa (formerly known as Tyronne Fernando Stadium)

Notes

References

External links 
 Multimedia coverage (Limited Overs Encounter: Full match)
 Multimedia coverage: Live updates
 St. Sebastian's College website
 Prince of Wales' College website
 66th Battle of the Golds – Official Theme Song

Big Matches
Sri Lankan cricket in the 20th century
Sri Lankan cricket in the 21st century